James William Cleland (1874 – 21 October 1914) was a Scottish Liberal Party politician and Barrister.

Background
He was born in Glasgow in 1874, the son of Charles Cleland, a manufacturer. He was educated at The Glasgow Academy before moving south to complete his education at Balliol College, Oxford, where he graduated with honours in the School of Jurisprudence. In 1897, whilst at University he became President of the Oxford Union.

Career
In 1899 he was called to the Bar at Middle Temple in London.
He returned to his native Glasgow to contest the 1900 General Election as Liberal candidate for Bridgeton, but was unsuccessful;

He returned to London and soon became active in politics in London and in 1901 he was elected to the London County Council for the Liberal backed Progressive Party, representing Lewisham. As part of the ruling administration, he was appointed Chairman of Parks and Establishment Committees. In 1903 he stood for parliament as Liberal candidate at the Lewisham by-election, finishing second;

After this unsuccessful attempt, he was re-elected in 1904 to the London County Council, again for Lewisham. In 1906 he again returned to his native Glasgow to contest the 1906 General Election as Liberal candidate for Bridgeton and was elected;

In 1907 he did not seek re-election to the London County Council so that he could concentrate on his parliamentary duties.
After one full parliamentary term, he sought re-election and was successful;

He chose not to defend his seat at the December 1910 General Election and did not stand for parliament again.

He remained single throughout his life and died in 1914 at the age of 40.

References

Sources
Who's Who; http://www.ukwhoswho.com

External links
 

1874 births
1914 deaths
Members of the Parliament of the United Kingdom for Glasgow constituencies
Members of the Parliament of the United Kingdom for Scottish constituencies
UK MPs 1906–1910
UK MPs 1910
Scottish Liberal Party MPs
Alumni of Balliol College, Oxford
Members of the Middle Temple
Members of London County Council
Presidents of the Oxford Union